Feng Wu from Microsoft Research Asia, Beijing, China was named Fellow of the Institute of Electrical and Electronics Engineers (IEEE) in 2013 for contributions to visual data compression and communication.

References

Fellow Members of the IEEE
Living people
Year of birth missing (living people)
Place of birth missing (living people)